Joseph Lorne McGuigan (born February 23, 1936) is a Canadian former politician. He served in the Legislative Assembly of New Brunswick from 1967 to 1974 from the electoral district of Saint John Centre, a member of the Progressive Conservative party.

References

1936 births
Living people